The Roman Catholic Archdiocese of Makassar is an archdiocese located in the city of Makassar in  South Sulawesi in Indonesia.

It covers parishes located in the administrative provinces of South Sulawesi, West Sulawesi and Southeast Sulawesi.

History
 April 13, 1937: Established as Apostolic Prefecture of Makassar from the Apostolic Vicariate of Celebes
 May 13, 1948: Promoted as Apostolic Vicariate of Makassar
 January 3, 1961: Promoted as Metropolitan Archdiocese of Makassar
 August 22, 1973: Renamed as Metropolitan Archdiocese of Ujung Pandang
 March 15, 2000: Renamed as Metropolitan Archdiocese of Makassar

Ecclesial provinces
Manado
Amboina

Leadership

 Archbishops of Makassar (Roman rite)
 Archbishop Johannes Liku Ada’ (11 November 1994 – present)
 Metropolitan Archbishops of Ujung Pandang (Roman Rite) 
 Archbishop Franciscus van Roessel, C.I.C.M. (18 January 1988 – 21 May 1994)
 Archbishop Theodorus Lumanauw (7 August 1973 – 18 May 1981)
 Metropolitan Archbishops of Makassar (Roman Rite) 
 Archbishop Nicolas Martinus Schneiders, C.I.C.M. (3 January 1961 – 7 August 1973)
 Vicars Apostolic of Makassar (Roman Rite) 
 Bishop Nicolas Martinus Schneiders, C.I.C.M. (later Archbishop) (10 June 1948 – 3 January 1961)
 Prefects Apostolic of Makassar (Roman Rite) 
 Fr. Gerardo Martino Uberto Martens, C.I.C.M. (11 June 1937 – 1948)

Suffragan dioceses
 Amboina 
 Manado

Sources
 GCatholic.org
 Catholic Hierarchy

Makassar
Roman Catholic dioceses in Indonesia
Christian organizations established in 1937
Roman Catholic dioceses and prelatures established in the 20th century
1937 establishments in the Dutch East Indies